The 1929–30 Ljubljana Subassociation League was the eleventh season of the Ljubljana Subassociation League. Ilirija won the league after defeating I. SSK Maribor with 7–6 on aggregate in the final. I. SSK Maribor won the first match 5–3, but Ilirija won the second match 4–1 to clinch the title.

Celje subdivision

Ljubljana subdivision

Maribor subdivision

Semi-final

Final

References

External links
Football Association of Slovenia 

Slovenian Republic Football League seasons
Yugo
2
Football
Football